Daniel B. Harris (born July 26, 1971) is a retired American journalist for ABC News. He was an anchor for Nightline and co-anchor of the weekend edition of Good Morning America.

Early life and education
Harris is the son of Nancy Lee Harris and Jay R. Harris. His father is the chair of the radiation oncology residency program at Harvard University and his mother is a pathologist at Massachusetts General Hospital in Boston and an expert on lymphomas. His younger brother, Matthew Carmichael Harris, is a venture capitalist. Harris graduated in 1993 from Colby College in Waterville, Maine.

Career

Journalism
Harris began his career as an anchor for WLBZ in Bangor, Maine. He then worked for two years at WCSH in Portland, Maine, as an anchor and political reporter. From 1997 to 2000 he was an anchor at New England Cable News.

He joined ABC News in 2000. He anchored World News Sunday from 2006 to 2011 and frequently anchored World News,                                              ABC World News Tonight weekend editions and Nightline. He is also a frequent contributor to World News. He also anchored ABC's coverage of Hurricane Katrina in September 2005.  In October 2010, he was named the new co-anchor for the weekend edition of Good Morning America. In October 2013, he was named a co-anchor for Nightline, succeeding Bill Weir. In August 2021, Harris announced that he would be leaving ABC News to focus on his meditation company. He retired from ABC News on September 26, 2021.

In addition to reporting on a range of natural disasters and several mass shootings, and from multiple combat zones, Harris led the network's reporting on religion, especially evangelicalism, and once spent 48 hours in solitary confinement for a story on criminal justice.　

On March 1, 2016, it was announced that Harris would become the host of the game show 500 Questions, replacing Richard Quest.

Meditation and authorship
Harris encourages the use of meditation, and himself uses a method of watching the breath. His "10% Happier" podcasts are interviews with other meditators.  Harris' book, 10% Happier: How I Tamed the Voice in My Head, Reduced Stress Without Losing My Edge, and Found Self-Help That Really Works – a True Story, was published in March 2014. Harris has said that his self-examination, abandonment of drugs, and adoption of meditation were prompted by an on-air panic attack in 2004. In the book, Harris recounts how he resolved the apparent conflict between meditation-induced equanimity and the aggressive competitiveness required for success as a TV-news journalist.

A meditation smartphone application was launched in 2015 and rebranded as 10% Happier, based on Harris' book.

Personal life
Harris is married to Dr. Bianca Harris; they have a son. Although he refers to himself as "half-Jewish“ and “culturally Jewish", he identifies as a Buddhist.

In high school Harris played the drums in a band with the bassist for the rock band The Unband.

Awards
Harris received an Edward R. Murrow Award for his reporting on a young Iraqi man who received the help he needed in order to move to America, and in 2009 won an Emmy Award for his Nightline report, "How to Buy a Child in Ten Hours".

He has been awarded honorary doctorates by his alma mater Colby College and by the Massachusetts College of Liberal Arts.

Bibliography
 10% Happier:  How I Tamed the Voice in My Head, Reduced Stress Without Losing My Edge, and Found Self-Help That Actually Works – A True Story (2014) 
 Meditation for Fidgety Skeptics: A 10% Happier How-to Book (2017), co-authored with Jeff Warren and Carlye Adler

See also
 Jewish Buddhists

References

External links
 ABC News Bio
 The Soup Cans Interview: Dan Harris, July 1, 2008

1971 births
ABC News personalities
American Buddhists
American game show hosts
Jewish American journalists
American television reporters and correspondents
Colby College alumni
Converts to Buddhism
Living people
News & Documentary Emmy Award winners
People from Newton, Massachusetts
21st-century American Jews